The 2015 Ondrej Nepela Trophy was the 23rd edition of an annual senior international figure skating competition held in Bratislava, Slovakia. A part of the 2015–16 ISU Challenger Series, it was held on October 1–3, 2015 at the Ondrej Nepela Ice Rink. Medals were awarded in the disciplines of men's singles, ladies' singles, pair skating, and ice dancing.

Entries
The preliminary entries were published on 26 August 2015.

Results

Men

Ladies

Pairs

Ice dancing

References

External links
 
 2015 Ondrej Nepela Trophy results
 23rd Ondrej Nepela Trophy at the International Skating Union

Ondrej Nepela Memorial
Ondrej Nepela Trophy, 2015
Ondrej Nepela Trophy